This is a list of presidential visits to foreign countries made by Christian Wulff as President of Germany. Wulff held the office from his election on 2 July 2010 until his resignation on 17 February 2012.

References

External links
 Official website about the appointments and journeys of President Wulff

Lists of diplomatic visits by heads of state
Wulff
Political history of Germany
State visits by German presidents